Huonville is a town on the Huon River, in the south-east of Tasmania, Australia. It is the seat of the Huon Valley Council area and lies 38 km south of Hobart on the Huon Highway. At the 2016 census, Huonville had a population of 2,714 and at the 2011 census had a population of 1,741.

History
The first Europeans to set eyes on the Huon River were the crew commanded by Admiral Bruni d'Entrecasteaux.  The river was named by him in honour of his second in command, Captain Huon de Kermadec. The name is preserved today in many features: the town, the river, the district and so on.  The first European settlers were William and Thomas Walton in 1840.

Huonville was not originally intended as the site of a town. Nearby Ranelagh was laid out as the town of Victoria in colonial days. Huonville grew around the bridge crossing the Huon River and hotels at the bridge. It was officially declared a town in 1891.

The township has faced significant threats due to climate change in recent years. Record floods in 2016 inundated a large section of the town, including twenty businesses The town has also come at risk due to major fires, and was an evacuation center during the 2019 bushfires.

Economy
Today the Huon Valley is best known as one of Tasmania's primary apple growing areas.  Once enormous in its extent, the significance of the industry has declined steadily since the 1950s and today cherries and fish farming are the rising commercial stars of the district.

The Huon River and the nearby d'Entrecasteaux Channel are popular fishing and boating areas.  The Channel is sheltered from the wrath of the Southern Ocean by the bulk of Bruny Island to the east. Tourism is an important part of Huonville and the surrounding Huon Valley. The area is renowned for its scenic beauty and history as one of Australia's biggest apple producers.

Poised on the edge of the south-west wilderness, forestry has been an important economic driver to the area since colonisation and in recent decades controversial. A wood-based industrial park nearby was the subject of extensive community discussion but is now built and operating successfully. There have been several recent controversies over development in the region, particularly over logging at Recherche Bay and the development of a tourist resort inside the National Park at Cockle Creek.

Notable people
 Amy Sherwina soprano singer dubbed "The Tasmanian Nightingale"

References

External links

 Huon Valley Council
 Huon Valley Environment Centre
 Huon Valley.net.au 

Localities of Huon Valley Council
Southern Tasmania